Spotlight is a 2015 American drama film directed by Tom McCarthy. The film, written by Josh Singer and McCarthy, follows The Boston Globes "Spotlight" team and its investigation of sexual abuse in Boston. It stars Mark Ruffalo, Michael Keaton, Rachel McAdams, John Slattery, Brian d'Arcy James and Liev Schreiber. The film was premiered at the 72nd Venice International Film Festival on September 3, 2015, where McCarthy won the Brian Award. It was also screened at the 2015 Toronto International Film Festival, where it was the second runner-up for the People's Choice Award. Open Road Films released it theatrically in the United States on November 6, 2015. The film was a commercial success, grossing $88.3 million worldwide on a budget of $20 million.

On the review aggregator Rotten Tomatoes, Spotlight holds a rating of 97%, based on 335 reviews. The film has been nominated for 138 awards, winning 71; its direction, screenplay and the performances of Ruffalo and McAdams have received the most attention from award groups. Spotlight received six nominations at the 88th Academy Awards, including Best Director (McCarthy), Best Supporting Actor (Ruffalo) and Best Supporting Actress (McAdams). It won Best Picture and Best Original Screenplay (McCarthy and Singer), making it the first film since The Greatest Show on Earth (1952) to win in the Best Picture category with only one other award. The film garnered three Golden Globe Award nominationsBest Motion Picture – Drama, Best Director, and Best Screenplay. Spotlight also won the Best Original Screenplay award at the 69th British Academy Film Awards, where it received two additional nominations.

At the 22nd Screen Actors Guild Awards, McAdams was nominated for her supporting role and the film's cast received the Outstanding Performance award. It received an award in the same category at the 21st Critics' Choice Awards, in addition to winning Best Picture and Best Original Screenplay. Keaton won the New York Film Critics Circle Award for Best Actor at its 2015 ceremony. In addition, Spotlight was named the best film of the year by several critics associations, including the Boston Society of Film Critics Awards, Detroit Film Critics Society, and National Board of Review.

Accolades

See also
 2015 in film

References

External links
 

Lists of accolades by film